Road Games (also known as Fausse Route) is a 2015 thriller film written and directed by Abner Pastoll. The film stars Andrew Simpson as a British hitchhiker travelling through France. IFC Films released the film theatrically in the United States on 4 March 2016. Icon Film Distribution released the film in the United Kingdom and Ireland on 26 August 2016.

Plot
Jack, a young British hitchhiker in the French countryside, attempts to get a ride to the ferry service back to England. After walking along the road for hours without having any cars stop, he comes upon an arguing couple who pull over and continue their fight. Concerned, Jack approaches the car and pulls the man out before he can strike the woman. The man backs off from Jack and drives away, leaving Jack with the woman, who introduces herself as a fellow hitchhiker named Véronique. Véronique tells him that there is a serial killer active on this road, which explains why Jack could not get a ride. The two agree to travel together for safety, and Véronique helps him work on his French. Véronique says she is a drifter whose parents blame her for her brother's accidental death, and Jack that, on the same day, he lost all his luggage and found his girlfriend cheating on him.

An eccentric man, Grizard, stops and offers the two a ride. Although Véronique is reluctant, Jack convinces her to accept Grizard's offer. When Grizard discovers that Jack is English, he enthusiastically invites Jack to meet his English wife.  Véronique protests at the detour, but Jack again convinces her to accept Grizard's hospitality. On the way to his house, Grizard stops to pick up roadkill and laughs when Jack suggests they bury it instead of eating it. Mary, Grizard's wife, turns out to be American, though she says she has also lived in England. During dinner, Jack reveals that he is a vegetarian and apologetically declines to eat their meat.  Grizard mocks him in French, upsetting Mary and Véronique.  When the conversation turns to the serial killer, Mary becomes upset and leaves the table.  Grizard insists they are safe in his house and urges them to stay the night.

Grizard puts Jack and Véronique in separate bedrooms. Jack finds photographs of a boy and girl in his room, but Grizard tells Jack they have no children. Before Jack goes to bed, Mary advises him to lock his door, which he does. That night, Véronique enters his bedroom, and they have sex. Jack invites her to come to England with him, and she excitedly accepts. When he wakes, she is nowhere to be found. Grizard says she has left and produces a note. Although Jack is suspicious, Grizard insists he immediately leave the house. As he leaves, Jack realises the handwriting on the note is not Véronique's. Before he can do anything else, he is drugged and kidnapped by Grizard's handyman, Delacroix. Delacroix says Jack must have annoyed Grizard a great deal, and, in French, variously threatens and mocks Jack; Jack says he does not understand and begs to be let go. Delacroix ties up Jack and puts him in his truck, but, before Delaxcroix can drive off, Jack escapes. Delacroix says to himself that Jack is in even worse trouble now that he has escaped.

Jack returns to Grizard's house, where he finds Véronique tied up. After freeing her, he arms himself with a shotgun. Jack and Véronique escape the house in a stolen car, pursued by Grizard and Mary, who have returned home. After a car chase in which their car flips, Jack and Véronique flee on foot.

They encounter Delacroix, who, after a scuffle, accidentally impales himself on a farm tool.  While Jack is not looking, Véronique kills Delacroix with a knife. Grizard and Mary find her and he has a vision of Véronique was a child, revealing her as their daughter. She claims then, as she does now, that she did not murder anyone and the death was accidental. In French, Mary and Grizard, revealed to be Véronique's parents, plead with her to return home and stop killing people, saying they cannot cover for her any more.

Véronique refuses. Before Mary can tell Jack the truth in English, Véronique knocks Mary unconscious with the shotgun and gags Grizard. As Véronique and Jack drive off together, Véronique checks to make sure she has Delacroix's knife. After the credits, Mary wakes up and cries at losing her daughter and Grizard despairs while gagged.

Cast
 Andrew Simpson as Jack
 Joséphine de La Baume as Véronique
 Frédéric Pierrot as Grizard
 Barbara Crampton as Mary
 Féodor Atkine as Delacroix
 Pierre Boulanger as Thierry

Production
Shooting took place mostly in England; twenty days were shot there, and five in France. To simulate French driving conditions, Pastoll had to close off a section of road so they could drive on the right side.

Scenes were also filmed at St Clere, Kent, where Jack, Veronique and Grizard arrive at the house and meet Mary. Scenes also took place at Falconhurst in Kent, where Delacroix drugs Jack and takes him in to the van to his barn, where he feeds him and then puts him back into truck room which Jack escapes. Shooting also took place at Castle Farm - Lavendar, Kent, where Jack and Veronique are seen running across the field away from Grizard and Mary.

Reception
Rotten Tomatoes, a review aggregator, reports that 83% of 18 surveyed critics gave the film a positive review; the average rating is 7/10. John DeFore of The Hollywood Reporter wrote, "Some of the surprises in store play better than others, whose narrative logic is difficult to fathom; then again, Pastoll's ultimate conceit leaves plenty of room for interpretation."  Nicolas Rapold of The New York Times wrote that the film becomes "less chilling than mildly confusing, and a little disappointing", falling short of its influences from the 1980s.

References

External links
 
 

2015 films
2015 multilingual films
2015 thriller films
2010s English-language films
2010s French-language films
British multilingual films
British thriller films
English-language French films
Films set in France
Films shot in France
Films shot in Kent
French multilingual films
French thriller films
2010s British films
2010s French films